Camões is a 1946 Portuguese drama film directed by José Leitão de Barros. It was entered into the 1946 Cannes Film Festival.

Cast
 António Vilar as Luís de Camões
 José Amaro as Dom Manuel de Portugal
 Igrejas Caeiro as André Falcão de Resende
 Paiva Raposo as Pero de Andrade Caminha
 Dina Salazar as Bourgeoisie of Coimbra
 Idalina Guimarães as Inês
 Leonor Maia as Leonor
 Manuel Lereno
 Júlio Pereira
 Carlos Moutinho as Caminha's Friend

References

External links

1946 films
1946 drama films
1940s biographical drama films
Portuguese biographical drama films
1940s Portuguese-language films
Portuguese black-and-white films
Films directed by José Leitão de Barros
Films set in the 16th century
Films set in Portugal